Sabatini is an Italian surname, see Sabbatini. Notable people with the surname include:

 Ambra Sabatini (born 2002), Italian athlete
 Anthony Sabatini (born 1988), American politician
 Bettina Sabatini (born 1966), Italian marathon runner
 David M. Sabatini (born 1968), American cell biologist and biochemist
 Fabio Sabatini (born 1985), Italian road bicycle racer
 Francesco Sabatini (1722–1797), Italian architect who worked in Spain
 Gabriela Sabatini (born 1970), Argentine female tennis player
 Gaetano Sabatini (1703–1734), Italian draftsman and painter
 Griffin Sabatini
 Lorenzo Sabatini (c. 1530–1576), Italian painter
 Oriana Sabatini
 Pat Sabatini
 Rafael Sabatini (1875–1950), Italian-British author
 Roberto Sabatini (born 1969), Italian-Australian aerospace researcher and academic
 Sandra Sabatini (born 1959), Canadian writer
 Walter Sabatini (born 1955), Italian former association football player

Italian-language surnames